Ashoknagar railway station is a small railway station in Ashoknagar district, Madhya Pradesh. Its code is ASKN. It serves Ashoknagar city. The station consists of two platforms. The platforms are not well sheltered. It lacks many facilities including water and sanitation. Ashoknagar is the part of Kota–Bina railway section of West Central Railway.

Major trains 

 Dayodaya Express
 Bhopal–Gwalior Intercity Express
 Sabarmati Express
 Ujjaini Express
 Jabalpur–Indore Intercity Express
 Gorakhpur–Okha Express
 Durg–Jaipur Weekly Express

References

Railway stations in Ashoknagar district
Bhopal railway division